Calvin Masawa is Kenyan professional footballer who plays as a defender for Kenyan Premier League side Nairobi City Stars.

Career
Masawa, a left cum right fullback, has served City Stars since the year 2011 after joining from Migori Youth.

He suffered relegation with City Stars in 2016, and was at the club at the point of promotion back to the top-flight in the year 2020.

Upon promotion in 2020, he extended his stay at the club to the end of the 2021/22 season.

Honours

Club
Nairobi City Stars
National Super League: 2019–20

References

External links
Calvin Masawa at Global Sports Archive

1994 births
Living people
Nairobi City Stars players
Kenyan footballers
Kenyan Premier League players
Association football defenders